The Ministry of Agriculture, Food and Rural Affairs (MAFRA) is a cabinet-level division of the government of South Korea. It is headquartered in the Sejong Government Complex in Sejong City. It was established as Ministry of Agriculture, with the founding of the First Republic of Korea in 1948.

The MAFRA is responsible for areas including crop insurance, land reclamation, agricultural statistics and the development of agricultural technology including genetically modified crops and environmentally friendly agriculture. It is also responsible for direct payments to rice farmers and for aspects of preparedness for natural disasters.

Mission 
The Ministry of Agriculture, Food and Rural Affairs shall administer affairs related to agriculture, livestock, foods, farmland, and irrigation, promotion of food industry, development of farming communities, and distribution of agricultural products

History 

7 July 1948: Newly organized the Ministry of Agriculture
29 March 1962: Removed the Local Society Bureau and newly organized the Rural Development Administration as an independent organization
28 February 1966: Removed the Fisheries Bureau and newly organized the Korea Fisheries Service as an independent organization
27 December 1966: Removed the Forestry Bureau and newly organized the Korea Forest Service as an independent organization
28 March 1973: Changed the name of the ministry from the Ministry of Agriculture to the Ministry of Agriculture and Fisheries
28 January 1974: Organized the Agricultural Statistics Office in each provinces, or Do's under the immediate control of the Minister
2 November 1981:
Removed the post of the Assistant Deputy Minister of Agriculture and Food
Maintained the part of Assistant Deputy Minister of Agricultural Administration; and the Assistant Deputy Minister of Food
31 December 1986: Changed the name of the ministry from the Ministry of Agriculture and Fisheries to the Ministry of Agriculture, Forestry, and Fisheries
8 August 1996: Changed the name of the ministry from the Ministry of Agriculture, Forestry and Fisheries to the Ministry of Agriculture
29 March 2006: FTA-exclusive Free Trade Negotiation Department 2 was newly organized in the International Agriculture Bureau
9 February 2007: Return-to-the-Soil Support Department and Livestock Resources Circulation Department were newly organized
30 November 2007:
Changed the name of institutes:
from National Plant Quarantine Center to National Plant Quarantine Service; and
from Korea Seed and Variety Center to Korea Seed and Variety Service
Changed the name of bureaus:
from Investments and Loans Evaluation and Statistics Team to Policy Evaluation and Statistics Bureau
from Agricultural Structure Policy Bureau to Agricultural Policy Bureau
from Agricultural Circulation Bureau to Agricultural Circulation and Food Industry Bureau; and
from Livestock Bureau to Livestock Policy Bureau
29 February 2008: Changed the name of the ministry from the Ministry of Agriculture to the Ministry for Food, Agriculture, Forestry and Fisheries
12 November 2012:
Newly formed the Agricultural Cooperative Marketing and Supply Support Team (a provisional team formed until October 31, 2015)
Changed the Four Major Rivers and Saemangeum Development Division to the Saemangeum Development Division
23 March 2013:
Changed the ministry name from the Ministry for Food, Agriculture, Forestry, and Fisheries to the Ministry of Agriculture, Food, and Rural Affairs.(The Fisheries Division is changed to the Ministry of Oceans and Fisheries and the Food safety Division is transferred to the Ministry of Food and Drug Safety)
The Animal, Plant, and Fisheries Quarantine and Inspection Agency is changed to the Animal and Plant Quarantine Agency, and the Training Institute for Food, Agriculture, and Fisheries is changed to the Food and Agriculture Officials Training Institute

Organization 
Organization: one vice minister, one deputy minister, two offices, four bureaus, eight policy bureaus, forty-three divisions (teams and officers) and five institutes
Quota: 3,237 people (538 people in the head office and 2,699 people in institutes)

Minister 
Policy Advisor to the Minister

Spokesperson 
Public Relations Division

Vice Minister

Deputy Minister

Inspector General 
Audit and Inspection Officer

General Services Division

Planning & Coordination Office

Policy Planning Bureau 
Planning & Statistics Division
Budget & Evaluation Division
Administrative Management Division
Regulation Reform & Legal Affairs Division
Information Division

Emergency & Security Planning Bureau

Rural Policy Bureau 
Rural Policy Division
Business & Human Resource Development Division
Rural Development Division
Rural Society Division

Agricultural Policy Bureau 
Agricultural Policy Division
Farmland Policy Division
Agricultural Financial Policy Division
Farm Income Stabilization Division
Agricultural Disaster Insurance Team
Agricultural Cooperative's Marketing & Supply Support Team

Food Grain Policy Bureau 
Food Grain Policy Division
Food Grain Industry Division
Rural Infrastructure Division
Saemangeum Development Division

International Cooperation Bureau 
General Division of International Cooperation
International Development & Cooperation Division
Agricultural Commerce Division
Quarantine Policy Division

Livestock Policy Bureau 
Livestock Policy Division
Livestock Management Division
General Division of Animan Health
Animal Health Management Division

Food Industry Policy Office 
National Food Cluster Team

Food Industry Policy Bureau 
Food Industry Policy Division
Food Industry Promotion Division
Food Service Industry Division
Export Promotion Team

Marketing Policy Bureau 
Marketing Policy Division
Horticulture Industry Division
Hotriculture Business Division
Climate Change Response Division

Customer & Science Policy Bureau 
Customer Policy Division
Environment-Friendly Agriculture Division
Science & Technology Policy Division
Seed & Life Industry Division

Ministers

See also

Agriculture in South Korea
Government of South Korea
Korea Forest Service

References

External links 
 Official English-language site

Agricultural organizations based in South Korea
South Korea
Forestry in South Korea
South Korea
Agriculture, Food and Rural Affairs
South Korea, Agriculture, Food and Rural Affairs
South Korea, Agriculture, Food and Rural Affairs
1948 establishments in Korea
Rural development ministries